The River Tiffey is a small river in Norfolk, England and a tributary of the River Yare. It rises near Hethel and passes through Wymondham before flowing generally north-eastwards passing through Kimberley, Carleton Forehoe, Wramplingham and Barford where the Tiffey joins  the River Yare.

Further reading 
History Along the Tiffey (2007) by Anne & Adrian Hoare

External links 

Tiffey Valley circular walk
Tiffey Trails Project

Tiffey
1Tiffey